Alois Beer  (February 27, 1833 – October 10, 1897)  was a Czech author and painter.

Information
After his apprenticeship in 1849 he went to Vienna, Prague,  Styria, Bavaria, northern Italy, Venice, Verona and Milan and Ljubljana. In Ljubljana, he attended painting courses.

After returning to Dobruška in 1858 he opened a business. In 1862 he married and in 1863 bought the house No. 100 in Opočenský street. In 1869 his first wife died and he married a second time, unhappily.

Beer was a great promoter of technical innovations. In a small town, he was considered eccentric and often mocked.  In 1886, he left his business to his son and devoted himself to painting.

He participated in the organization of economic and industrial exhibitions in Dobruška in 1889 and 1892. Here he received recognition and finally gained some respect from the locals. He died there in 1897.

One of his most famous works is of the major fire which broke out in Dobruška on October 7, 1866. Approximately 3500 pages of his text and images are held in the Dobruška Museum of Natural History. His texts and pictures of individual buildings, local customs, events and festivals, trade practices and tools, offer significant details of everyday life in that region in the 19th century. A Beer exhibition was organized in Prague in 1937.

See also
List of Czech painters

References

1833 births
1897 deaths
People from Dobruška
19th-century Czech painters
Czech male painters
19th-century Czech male artists